A cyclograph (also known as an arcograph) is an instrument for drawing arcs of large diameter circles whose centres are inconveniently or inaccessibly located, one version of which was invented by Scottish architect and mathematician Peter Nicholson.

Description
In his autobiography, published in 1904, polymath Herbert Spencer eloquently describes his own near re-invention of Nicholson's cyclograph while working as a civil engineer for the Birmingham and Gloucester Railway.

See also

 Spirograph

References

Technical drawing tools